Awkwafina Is Nora from Queens (or simply Nora from Queens) is an American comedy television series starring Awkwafina that first aired on January 20, 2020, on Comedy Central. The series was renewed for a second season before the series premiere, and received generally favorable reviews from critics. The second season premiered on August 18, 2021. In May 2022, the series was renewed for a third season.

Premise
Awkwafina Is Nora from Queens follows a "20-something woman, named Nora Lum, in Queens who strives for a larger-than-life existence." Raised alongside her cousin by her dad and grandma, Nora leans on her family as she navigates young adulthood in New York City.

Cast

Main
 Awkwafina as Nora, a fictionalized version of herself
 Lori Tan Chinn as her grandmother who helps raise her
 BD Wong as Wally, Nora's father (season 2; recurring season 1)

Recurring
 Chrissie Fit as Melanie, Nora's best friend.
 Jonathan Park as Doug
 Bowen Yang as Edmund, Nora's cousin
 Jennifer Esposito as Brenda, Wally's girlfriend

Guest stars
 Jaboukie Young-White as Daniel
 Michelle Buteau as Margaret
 Wai Ching Ho as Le-Wei
 Stephanie Hsu as Shu Shu (Hsu plays a younger version of Shu Shu in season 1)
 Ming-Na Wen as Sandra, Nora's aunt (season 1)
 Laverne Cox as the voice of God (season 1)
 Natasha Lyonne as Woman in hair salon (season 1)
 Jamie Chung as Young Grandma (season 1)
 Simu Liu as Garbage Boy (season 1)
 Harry Shum Jr. as Doc Hottie (season 1)
 Celia Au as Grace (season 1)
 Makeda Declet as Chenise (season 1)
 Bella Heathcote as Joey (season 1)
 Chloe Fineman as Greta (season 2)
 Ross Butler as Chuck (season 2)
 Alan Kim as Young Wally (season 2)
 Lauren Ash as herself (season 2)
 Margaret Cho as Mistress Jupiter (season 2)
 Haley Joel Osment as Amos (season 2)

Episodes

Series overview

Season 1 (2020)

Season 2 (2021)

Production

Development
On April 17, 2018, it was announced that Comedy Central had given the production a pilot order. The episode was written by Awkwafina and Teresa Hsiao. Executive producers were set to include Awkwafina, Karey Dornetto, Peter Principato, and Itay Reiss. Dornetto was also expected to serve as showrunner and Hsiao as a co-executive producer. Production companies involved with the pilot were expected to include Principato-Young Entertainment, later rebranded as Artists First.

On November 29, 2018, it was announced that Comedy Central had given the production a series order for a first season consisting of ten episodes. Awkwafina, Hsiao, and Dornetto were set to write for the series and Lucia Aniello was expected to direct and executive produce. Ahead of the series premiere, on January 14, 2020, it was reported that Comedy Central renewed the series for a second season. On May 12, 2022, Comedy Central renewed the series for a third season.

Casting
Alongside the pilot order announcement, it was confirmed that Awkwafina would star in the production. Concurrent with the series order, it was announced that BD Wong and Lori Tan Chinn would star in the series. In July 2019, Chrissie Fit and Jonathan Park joined the cast in recurring roles. On August 14, 2019, Jennifer Esposito was cast in a recurring capacity. On March 24, 2021, Alan Kim was cast in a guest starring role for the second season.

Filming
Principal photography for the pilot began on July 20, 2018 in Queens, New York City, New York. In the last episode of season one, part of the story's background is set in Beijing, China, but it was actually filmed at Taoyuan International Airport and in Taipei, Taiwan.

Release
The series premiered on January 22, 2020 on Comedy Central. In August 2020, it was announced that the series would be available on HBO Max, with the second season airing on the service after its first-run broadcast on Comedy Central. The trailer for the second season was released on July 22, 2021. The second season premiered on August 18, 2021.

Reception

Critical reception 
On Rotten Tomatoes, the series holds an approval rating of 80% with an average rating of 6.75/10, based on 30 reviews. The site's consensus states that "Nora From Queens showcases Awkwafina's charming brashness and surrounds her with an equally delightful cast—especially scene stealer Lori Tan Chinn—but it could stand to walk a less familiar comedic beat." On Metacritic, it has a weighted average score of 66 out of 100, based on 19 critics, indicating "generally favorable reviews". Linda Holmes of NPR states "There's a lot of pressure on creators of color to be groundbreaking — to sell their shows as both good and somehow ethically nutritious. Awkwafina's place in that calculus is complicated by legitimate questions about her own treatment of cultural traditions she's not part of. But it's also fair to evaluate Awkwafina Is Nora from Queens as an entry in a line of single-camera comedy series amplifying one distinctive sensibility (Insecure, Louie, Chewing Gum, Broad City, even Portlandia). And as part of that line, it holds up well." According to IMDb, "Grandma and Chill" is the highest-rated episode of season one, followed by the season finale, "China".

Ratings
The series premiere obtained 0.49 million viewers, making it the highest rated season one premiere for Comedy Central since 2017. Several days later, Comedy Central announced that Awkwafina Is Nora from Queens amassed 3.8 million total viewers (2.2 million came from the simulcast and replays of the episode and 1.6 million came from YouTube views). On social media, the series ranked the first in the most social primetime cable comedy of the night with 39,000 social interactions across Facebook, Twitter, and Instagram. The second season of the series saw a 20% increase on rating and 14% increase in share from the Season 1 average.

Notes
A sneak peek at the show's sixth episode aired on January 20, 2020, before the premiere of the pilot in its regular timeslot. The episode later re-aired on February 26, 2020.

References

External links
 
 

2020 American television series debuts
2020s American comedy television series
Asian-American television
Comedy Central original programming
English-language television shows
Queens, New York, in fiction
Television shows set in Queens